Blind Men is a British television sitcom produced by LWT and transmitted on the ITV network between 21 November 1997 and 2 January 1998.

Written by the duo Chris England and Nick Hancock, the series starred Jesse Birdsall and Roger Blake as Phil Carver and Bob as the window blind salesmen and Graham Holdcroft (Jeremy Swift) is a hard-working but not too successful window blinds people. Rival salesmen Tony, Neil and Bob compete with him for sales, encouraged by their young and verbally abusive boss Ian Stapleton. Things go downhill for the team when wonder-salesman Phil Carver is transferred in and the rivalry really intensifies. The show's theme tune was a cover of the ABBA hit single from 1980 called The Winner Takes It All.

Cast
Jesse Birdsall – Phil Carver
Roger Blake – Bob
Tamsin Greig – Valerie Marsden
Raji James	– Neil
Danny Swanson – Ian
Jeremy Swift – Graham Holdcroft
Andy Taylor – Tony
Sophie Thompson – Caroline Holdcroft

Episodes

References

External links
 

1990s British sitcoms
1997 British television series debuts
1998 British television series endings
London Weekend Television shows
Television series by ITV Studios
ITV sitcoms
English-language television shows
Television shows set in London